The speckle-breasted wren (Pheugopedius sclateri) is a species of bird in the family Troglodytidae. It is found in Colombia, Ecuador, and Peru.

Taxonomy and systematics

The speckle-breasted wren has at times been treated as conspecific with rufous-breasted wren (P. rutilus) and  spot-breasted wren (P. maculipectus). They do form a superspecies.

The International Ornithological Committee (IOC) and the Clements taxonomy recognize three subspecies. The names in parentheses are from Clements.

P. s. sclateri (Marañon)  Taczanowski (1879)
P. s. columbianus (Colombian) Chapman (1924)
P. s. paucimaculatus (speckle-breasted) Sharpe (1882)

BirdLife International (BLI) treats all three subspecies as separate species and calls them the "Maranon", "Colombian", and "speckle-breasted" wrens.

Description

Adults have a reddish brown crown and a medium brown back and rump. Their tail has alternating gray and dull black bars. They have a narrow white supercilium and a dark eyestripe; the sides of the face and neck are mottled black and white. Their underparts from the chin down through the lower belly have fine black and white bars. The lower belly and flanks have bars but they are more diffuse, and the flanks also have a buff wash. Juveniles are similar to the adults but their underside's bars do not go as far down the belly.

Adults have uniform brown upperparts with a rufous tinge to the crown and their tails have broad dark bars. They have a narrow white supercilium. Their face and most of their underparts are white with black bars and spots; the flanks are dark buff.

Males average  and females . Adults have uniform brown upperparts with black bars on the tail. They have a narrow white supercilium and black and white speckled cheeks. Most of the underparts are whitish, with a heavily black-speckled breast, and the flanks are rufescent. The juvenile is similar but its breast is not as heavily speckled.

Distribution and habitat

The subspecies of speckle-breasted wren are found thus:

P. s. sclateri (Marañon), the drainage of the Marañon River in extreme southern Ecuador and northern Peru
P. s. columbianus (Colombian), Colombia; separately the western slopes of the Central and Eastern Andes
P. s. paucimaculatus (speckle-breasted), south from Ecuador's Manabí Province into Peru's Department of Piura

The three subspecies occur in somewhat different habitats. P. s. sclateri inhabits the undergrowth of dry forest up to approximately  elevation. P. s. paucimaculatus inhabits the interior and edges of deciduous semi-humid woodland, especially those with a dense understory.

Behavior

Feeding

P. s. paucimaculatus is known to eat insects, and the other two subspecies are assumed to also be mostly or completely insectivorous. It and P. s. sclateri are known to forage in the understory, though the former also sometimes goes higher. They are usually in pairs and often join mixed-species foraging flocks. P. s. columbianus is assumed to have a similar strategy.

Breeding

Only P. s. paucimaculatus breeding phenology has been studied. Its breeding season apparently spans from April to September, based on the dates of observation of an active nest, of adults carrying food, and of recent fledglings. The one described nest was enclosed, made from sticks, vines, leaves, and lichen, and was on the ground; it held four eggs.

Vocalization

The songs of the three subspecies of speckle-breasted wren have no known differences. The song is "a series of fast, repeated phrases" sung by both sexes . The call is "a musical rising trill" .

Status

The IUCN has separately assessed all of the subspecies of speckle-breasted wren as being of Least Concern. All three have relatively small ranges. P. s. sclateri and P. s. paucimaculatus occur in several protected areas, are fairly common to common, and appear to have enough of their preferred habitats. However, the population of P. s. columbianus is believed to be decreasing due to habitat fragmentation and destruction.

References

}
speckle-breasted wren
Birds of Ecuador
Birds of Peru
Birds of the Tumbes-Chocó-Magdalena
speckle-breasted wren
speckle-breasted wren
Taxonomy articles created by Polbot